Museum Het Leids Wevershuis consists of one of the last remaining "weavers' homes" (1560) in Leiden, Netherlands. The exterior, the large antique loom (1830) and the interior, are testimony of the once flourishing textile industry (and trade) around Leiden, in particular during the 16th and 17th century, when many home weavers supplied the draper's guild with high quality woolen cloth.

Museum

The building and its antique interior are the museum. There is a small collection of modern hand-woven textiles. The museum has a weaver available most days to demonstrate the craft on a large loom. Products made during demonstrations are for sale.

The museum is a short walking distance from the old Draper's guild, part of Museum De Lakenhal (Dutch for Cloth Hall) today.

History of the building
Located on a spot which had always been used as a laborer's home, the house fell almost victim to a great plan to modernize the city in the 1960s (which never materialized due to opposition). It was never granted the rijksmonument status.

In the 1970s it attracted the attention of a small group of local historians and they formed Het Kleine Leidse Woonhuis in 1976 to save small old buildings in Leiden such as this one. The building was consolidated (not renovated) as a house in a neck-gable style around 1900. The mostly intact interior reflects living arrangements for workers in the early 20th-century in Leiden.
An original cellar exists under the house and parts of the interior date back to the 17th-century.

Today it is part of a group of small houses in a neighborhood of mostly cement and modern brick constructions from the 1960s and 1970s.

Occupants of the house, and their profession

An inscription in the narrow hallway of the house tells about the people who owned or rented the house, and their professions. Most dwellers worked in the textile industry.

Gallery

References

External links 
  incl. photos before and after consolidation 
Video presentation of the museum

Museums in Leiden
2005 establishments in the Netherlands
Weaving
21st-century architecture in the Netherlands